René Benjamin (1885 in Paris, France - 1948 in Tours, France) was a French writer. In 1915 he received the Prix Goncourt for his novel Gaspard. In 1938, he became the first Goncourt laureate to be appointed a member of the Académie Goncourt, the jury that decides the winner of the prize.

External links
 

1885 births
1948 deaths
Writers from Paris
People affiliated with Action Française
20th-century French novelists
20th-century French male writers
French military personnel of World War I
Prix Goncourt winners
Order of the Francisque recipients
French male novelists